The Orroral Valley tracking station, was Earth station in Australia, supported Earth-orbiting satellites, as part of NASA's Spacecraft Tracking and Data Acquisition Network (STADAN). It was located approximately 50 km south of Canberra, Australian Capital Territory (ACT), and was one of three tracking stations in the ACT, and seven in Australia.

Construction of the site commenced shortly after site selection in 1963 and was completed in May 1965. It was home to a 26 m antenna and several smaller VHF and microwave frequency antennas.

The main requirement of the station, as distinct from the long-range communication tasks of Tidbinbilla and Honeysuckle Creek, was to be able to quickly switch from supporting one satellite to another. The signal received from satellites in Earth orbit are relatively strong but view periods are short, a few minutes being typical. Many of the supported satellites used different systems for transmitting data, or for receiving commands so the station had to cope with a variety of equipment for support of the individual satellites. Data from the satellites were recorded on magnetic tape and air-freighted to the United States for study.

The station supported the joint Apollo-Soyuz project in 1975, which saw American astronauts and Soviet cosmonauts link in Earth orbit and conduct joint experiments in space. In April 1981, Orroral tracking station supported the Space Shuttle Columbia. It provided telecommunication support to Space Shuttle missions until its closure in 1985.

The 26 m telescope was moved in 1985 to Tasmania, Australia, and now forms the core of the Mount Pleasant Radio Observatory run by the School of Mathematics and Physics, University of Tasmania.

In 2018, Orroral Valley Tracking Station was the endpoint for the annual ANU Inward Bound.

In 2019, a paraglider landed at the Orroral Valley Tracking Station and was promptly attacked by a wild kangaroo. The pilot suffered no injuries from the attack.

See also 
 Spacecraft Tracking and Data Acquisition Network
 Canberra Deep Space Communication Complex
 Carnarvon Tracking Station
 Honeysuckle Creek Tracking Station

References 

 

Apollo program facilities
Space Shuttle facilities
NASA facilities in Australia
NASA radio communications and spacecraft tracking facilities
Earth stations in the Australian Capital Territory
1965 establishments in Australia
1985 disestablishments in Australia